Katherine J. Mack (born 1 May 1981) is a theoretical cosmologist who holds the Hawking Chair in Cosmology and Science Communication at Perimeter Institute. Her academic research investigates dark matter, vacuum decay and the epoch of reionisation. Mack is also a popular science communicator who participates in social media and regularly writes for Scientific American, Slate, Sky & Telescope, Time, and Cosmos.

Early life and education 

Mack became interested in science as a child and built solar-powered cars out of Lego blocks. Her mother is a fan of science fiction, and encouraged Mack to watch Star Trek and Star Wars. Her grandfather was a student at Caltech and worked on the Apollo 11 mission. She became more interested in spacetime and the Big Bang after attending talks by scientists such as Stephen Hawking. 

Mack attended California Institute of Technology, and appeared as an extra in the opening credits of the 2001 American comedy film Legally Blonde when they filmed on campus. She received her undergraduate degree in physics in 2003. Mack obtained her PhD in astrophysics from Princeton University in 2009. Her thesis on the early universe was supervised by Paul Steinhardt.

Research and career 
After earning her doctorate, Mack joined the University of Cambridge as a Science and Technology Facilities Council (STFC) postdoctoral research fellow at the Kavli Institute for Cosmology. Later in 2012, Mack was a Discovery Early Career Researcher Award (DECRA) Fellow at the University of Melbourne. Mack was involved with the construction of the dark matter detector SABRE.

In January 2018, Mack became an Assistant Professor and a member of university's Leadership in Public Science Cluster in the Department of Physics at North Carolina State University. She joined the Perimeter Institute for Theoretical Physics in June 2022, as the inaugural Hawking Chair in Cosmology and Science Communication. The Canadian multidisciplinary research organization CIFAR named her one of the CIFAR Azrieli Global Scholars in 2022.

Mack works at the intersection between fundamental physics and astrophysics. Her research considers dark matter, vacuum decay, the formation of galaxies, observable tracers of cosmic evolution and the Epoch of Reionisation. Mack has described dark matter as one of science's "most pressing enigmas". She has worked on dark matter self-annihilation Mack has investigated whether the accretion of dark matter could result in the growth of primordial black holes (PBHs). She has worked on the impact of PBHs on the cosmic microwave background. She has become increasingly interested, too, in the end of the universe.

Public engagement and advocacy 
Mack maintains a strong science outreach presence on both social and traditional media. She has been described by Motherboard and Creative Cultivate as a "social media celebrity". Mack is a popular science writer, and has contributed to The Guardian, Scientific American, Slate, The Conversation, Sky & Telescope, Gizmodo, Time and Cosmos, as well as providing expert information to the BBC. Mack's Twitter account has over 300,000 followers; her response to a climate change denier on that platform gained mainstream coverage, as did her "Chirp for LIGO" upon the first detection of gravitational waves.
She was the 2017 Australian Institute of Physics Women in Physics lecturer, in which capacity she spent three weeks delivering talks at schools and universities across Australia.

In 2018, Mack was chosen to be one of the judges for Nature  magazine's newly founded Nature Research Awards for Inspiring Science and Innovating Science. In February 2019 Mack appeared in an episode of The Jodcast, talking about her work and science communication. Mack was a member of the jury for the Alfred P. Sloan Prize in the 2019 Sundance Film Festival. In 2019, she was referenced on the Hozier track 'No Plan' from his album Wasteland, Baby!: "As Mack explained, there will be darkness again".

She is a member of the Sloan Science & Film community, where she works on science fiction.

Her first book, The End of Everything (Astrophysically Speaking), was published by Simon & Schuster in August 2020, the firm having won the rights to Mack's first book in an eight-way bidding battle. It considers the five scenarios for the end of  universe (both theoretically and practically), and has received positive reviews both for its science outreach accuracy and its wit. 
The book  is also a New York Times Notable Book and features on the best books of the year lists of The Washington Post, The Economist, New Scientist, Publishers Weekly, and The Guardian.

Personal life
Mack is interested in the intersection of art, poetry and science. She is bisexual.

References

External links

 
  
 Katie Mack at NC State University

American astrophysicists
Science communicators
California Institute of Technology alumni
Princeton University alumni
North Carolina State University faculty
American science writers
American bisexual people
American LGBT scientists
Women science writers
21st-century American physicists
21st-century American women scientists
Bisexual women
Bisexual scientists
American women academics
Women astrophysicists
Living people
1981 births